The Wolf Law Library is located at the College of William & Mary's School of Law in Williamsburg, Virginia, United States. It contains a 380,000 volume collection and is a member of the Consortium of Southeastern Law Libraries.

In 2008, The Princeton Review rated William & Mary's collective library system as the eighth best in the country and number one in the state of Virginia for a university system. The ranking was based on a survey of 120,000 students from 368 campuses nationwide.

Mission statement
"The mission of the Wolf Law Library is to provide access to law and law-related resources and a wide range of services to support law school curriculum and programs, promote the advancement of legal scholarship, and fulfill the information needs of library users."

History

Present day
By the end of the twentieth century, the William & Mary Law Library was cramped and in need of overall renovation.  With a strong budget, professional staff, and large collection, a $16.8-million renovation began in 2003 to address those needs. Construction between the spring of 2005 and the summer of 2006 added  of space to the library.

On November 10, 2006, the library was renamed the Wolf Law Library to honor alumnus Henry C. Wolf (Bachelor of Arts, 1964; Juris Doctor, 1966).

References

External links
Wolf Law Library
The College of William & Mary Law School
Swem Library

College of William & Mary buildings
1779 establishments in Virginia
University and college academic libraries in the United States
Library buildings completed in 2007
Libraries in Virginia
Libraries established in 1779